Kitrick Lavell Taylor (born July 22, 1964) is a former professional American football player. A wide receiver in the National Football League from 1988–1993, Taylor is probably best known for catching Brett Favre's first ever winning touchdown pass in the NFL, a 35-yard strike with thirteen seconds remaining to defeat the Cincinnati Bengals 24–23 on September 20, 1992.

From Pomona, California, Taylor played college football at Washington State University in Pullman under head coach Jim Walden. As a junior in 1985, he was All-Pac-10 as a punt returner, and was selected in fifth round of the 1987 NFL Draft by the Kansas City Chiefs.

Taylor was a wide receiver and played on special teams for the Chiefs in 1988. He played for the New England Patriots in 1989 and the San Diego Chargers in 1990 and 1991. Taylor was with the Green Bay Packers in 1992 and finished his career with the Denver Broncos in 1993. He totaled 414 receiving yards and one receiving touchdown in his six-year career.

He also had a punt return for a touchdown while playing for the Chargers in the penultimate game of the 1990 season. It was against the visiting Chiefs on December 23 from 55 yards out, which tied the game early in the fourth quarter.

References

External links
 The record starts here
 

1964 births
Living people
Players of American football from Los Angeles
American football wide receivers
Washington State Cougars football players
Kansas City Chiefs players
New England Patriots players
San Diego Chargers players
Green Bay Packers players
Denver Broncos players